The list of number-one albums in Spain from 1969 to 1979 is derived from the Top 100 España record chart published weekly by PROMUSICAE (Productores de Música de España), a non-profit organization composed by Spain and multinational record companies.

Albums are listed chronologically by the date each reached number one on the chart for the first time.

Number-one albums of the 1970s

See also
List of number-one hits (Spain)

References

Number-one albums
Number-one albums
Spain Albums
Spain Albums
Spanish record charts